Groß Vielen is a village and a former municipality in the Mecklenburgische Seenplatte district, in Mecklenburg-Vorpommern, Germany. Since 7 June 2009, it is part of the town Attractions 
grade II listed timber-framed Church, built in 1774. The Bell dates from the 14th or 15th century.
reconstructed Manor House in the village of za (now a therapeutic facility of the Blue Cross)Penzlin.

Villages in Mecklenburg-Western Pomerania